Nicolás Lapentti was the defending champion but lost in the final 6–7(6–8), 6–2, 6–3 against Thomas Muster.

Seeds
A champion seed is indicated in bold text while text in italics indicates the round in which that seed was eliminated.

Draw

References
 1996 Cerveza Club Colombia Open Draw

Bancolombia Open
Cerveza Club Columbia Open